Prasinoxena viridissima is a species of moth in the family Pyralidae first described by Charles Swinhoe in 1903. It was found in Selangor, Malaysia.

References

External links
Original description: Swinhoe, Charles (1903). "Report on the Heterocera". Fasciculi Malayenses: 98.

Pyralidae
Moths described in 1903